Šibenik cap is a regional variant of a traditional red cap used in the Balkans that was developed in Šibenik, Croatia.

History
The cap is more orange in colour instead of red, and simplified in cut (without a conical top, flat from above). It is embroidered with characteristic black ornament and without any hanging appendixes.
The cap was modified upon older traditional forms during a work time of Industry of Folk Embroidery held by Matavulj family in Croatian city of Šibenik from 1844 to 1945.

The cap is well known throughout Croatia and is noticeable as a symbol of Šibenik and widely known among regional costume parts in general, not only representing Šibenik and its surroundings, but northern Dalmatia or a general Croatian identity when represented outside Croatia.

Šibenik cap is a tradition enlisted on the national intangible heritage list, in 2008.

See also
 Lika cap
 Montenegrin cap

References

Further reading
 Schubert, Gabriella (1993). Kleidung als Zeichen: Kopfbedeckungen im Donau-Balkan-Raum. Berlin: Harrassowitz Verlag.

External links
List of Protected Intangible Heritage at Ministry of Culture Official Website 
Cap & Hat Manufacture

Caps
Croatian clothing
Dalmatia